The Telegraph Act 1899 is an Act of Parliament in the United Kingdom that allowed urban district, borough and burgh councils to construct and operate telephone exchanges, on a similar basis to the then-usual municipal provision of other utilities.

Licences were granted to Glasgow, Belfast, Grantham, Huddersfield, Tunbridge Wells, Brighton, Chard, Portsmouth, Hull, Oldham, Swansea, Scarborough and West Hartlepool. Six of these licences were used to provide a telephone service:

Glasgow (1901)
Tunbridge Wells (1901)
Swansea (1902)
Portsmouth (1902)
Brighton (1903)
Hull (1904)

Of these, only the Hull service remains as an independent operation and is now known as KCOM.

External links
Original text

United Kingdom Acts of Parliament 1899
Local government legislation in England and Wales